Sky Blues may refer to:

 Coventry City F.C., in the English football league
 Manchester City F.C., in the English football league
 Sydney FC, in the Australian A-League
 Magherafelt Sky Blues F.C., in the Ballymena & Provincial Intermediate League of Northern Ireland
 Duke of Buckingham's Light Infantry ("The Sky Blues"), a fictional regiment of the British Army

See also
 Sky Blue (disambiguation)